Aurora dos Sonhos is the third studio album by the Brazilian progressive rock group Apocalypse. One year after Perto do Amanhecer, Apocalypse released Aurora dos Sonhos through Musea Records. The album dealt with different issues like conservation of nature, science fiction and spirituality. The tracks scan the fields of Neo Prog and Symphonic Rock with comfort, most of the guitar melodies are fantastic, while Eloy Fritsch seems to be another talented keyboard wizard, torturing his minimoog synthesizer with easiness. Many shifting moods and diverse textures guarantee another enjoyable release by the band.

Track listing
 "Jamais Retornarei" – 6:23
 "Em Apenas Um Segundo" – 6:34
 "Ultimo Horizonte" – 12:54
 "A Um Passo Da Eternidade" – 9:52
 "Do Outro Lado Da Vida" – 9:57
 "Vindo Das Estrelas" – 12:13

Personnel 
 Eloy Fritsch: Synthesizer, Piano, organ, moog, vocals
 Ruy Fritsch: Electric and acoustic guitars, vocals
 Chico Fasoli: Drums, percussion, vocals
 Chico Casara: Lead Vocal, Bass guitar

References

1996 albums
Apocalypse (band) albums